Sathya  is a 2017 Indian Tamil-language mystery film directed by Pradeep Krishnamoorthy. An official remake of the Telugu film Kshanam (2016), the film stars Sibi Sathyaraj, Remya Nambeesan and Varalaxmi Sarathkumar. The film, produced by Maheshwari Sathyaraj under the banner Nathambal Film Factory, has music composed by Simon K. King and was released worldwide on 8 December 2017.

Plot
Sathya, who is working in Sydney, gets a voice call from his ex-lover Shweta. They worked in the same office and wanted to get married, but her father arranged an alliance with an entrepreneur named Gowtham. Sathya leaves for India with the pretense of attending a marriage in their relatives' household. He takes a car for hire from Babu Khan, a travel agent. Sathya also takes a SIM card on his sister's address and stays at Hotel Marriott.
Sathya meets Shweta at a restaurant and learns her five-year-old daughter Ria is missing. Things become worse when no one except Shweta, including Gowtham, believes that Ria exists. Sathya also learns about Gowtham's brother Bobby, a drug addict who regularly visits their home.

Sathya begins an informal investigation which fails many times, also inviting the ire of two Afro-American gangsters in the city. Babu, who helps them in transporting drugs, saves Sathya on humanitarian grounds. Posing as Vasanth Menon, a police officer, Sathya meets Gowtham and learns that the couple was childless. Gowtham recalls Shweta being attacked by two masked men before a school to steal her car. He added that Shweta went into a coma and post-recovery started claiming that she had a five-year-old daughter named Ria. Perplexed, Sathya later watches a closed-circuit television video footage of the masked men attacking Shweta on the day when Ria went missing. Unfortunately, Ria is seen nowhere in the footage, which makes Sathya doubt Shweta's mental condition.

He confronts Shweta, who refuses to acknowledge that Ria is imaginary. Sathya sees height markings of a child on a wall, and before he could react, Shweta commits suicide. ACP Anuya Bharathwaj and Police Inspector Chowdary investigate the suicide case. Vasanth is killed in Marriott, and Babu confesses to Sathya that he saw Bobby kidnapping Ria. They meet Anuya and Chowdary and get Bobby arrested. In custody, Bobby is killed by Anuya as an act of self-defense. That same night, Vasanth's murderers attack Babu and Sathya, and Babu is killed in the process of shooting the murderers to death. Sathya watches an MMS in the murderers' phone sent by Anuya instructing to kill him. Sathya meets Anuya at her farmhouse, where Ria is hidden. Anuya reveals that Gowtham wanted to kill Ria and arranged the attack, after which she found Ria in Bobby's custody.

Gowtham wanted Shweta to suffer; he convinced all his friends and family to pretend that Ria never existed, saying Shweta cannot bear the shock of Ria's death. Before Anuya could kill Sathya, Chowdary shoots her after listening to the conversation on his way to the farmhouse with his subordinates. Gowtham is arrested and reveals that Ria was not his daughter, as a medical report confirmed him sterile in the past. Sathya recollects that on their last night together in India before separation, he and Shweta had intercourse. As Sathya realizes that Ria is his biological child and approaches her, he sees a reflection of Shweta smiling at him.

Cast

Sibi Sathyaraj as Sathya
Ramya Nambeesan as Swetha
Varalaxmi Sarathkumar as ACP Anuya Bharathwaj
Baby Sherin as Riya
Sathish as Babu Khan
Anandaraj as Inspector Chowdhary
Ravi Varma as Bobby
Siddhartha Shankar as Gowtham
Nizhalgal Ravi as Swetha's father
Yogi Babu as Ram
Balaji Venugopal as Vasanth Menon
Vinodhini Vaidyanathan as Hema
M. Seetharaman as ACP Velaikkaran
Santhosh as SI Ganesh
Sarath as Constable Reddy
Ashok as R. Srinivas 
Aathma Patrick as Hitman
Yogi Ram as Hitman
Chrisitan Pepe Butudu as Nigerian
Scarface as Nigerian
Kuje Solomon Shedrach as Nigerian
Noped Emmanuelp as Nigerian
Mecennah as Stacy
Rajesh as Anuya's husband
Galatha Guru as Bobby's friend
Aravind Janakiraman as Maarvaadi
Guru as Security
Arun as Commissioner

Production
In April 2016, Sibi Sathyaraj bought the Tamil remake rights of Kshanam for his home studios, Naathambal Film Factory, and signed on Pradeep Krishnamoorthy of Saithan (2016) fame to direct the film. Although Adah Sharma, who played a pivotal role in the original, was originally considered for the role, she had to be replaced because she demanded high remuneration. Eventually, Remya Nambeesan replaced her as the film's female lead in mid-October 2016.
Actors Varalaxmi Sarathkumar, Anandaraj and Sathish were cast to play pivotal characters. Ravi Varma, who played a drug addict in the original, was signed to reprise his role in this film, which marks his Tamil debut. Simon K. King of Ainthu Ainthu Ainthu fame had been roped in to take care of the music department, while Arunmani Palani of Anandhapurathu Veedu fame cranking the camera and Goutham Ravichandran providing the cuts.

Soundtrack
The film's soundtrack was composed by Simon K. King, previously credited as Simon on earlier films, Ainthu Ainthu Ainthu and Aindhaam Thalaimurai Sidha Vaidhiya Sigamani. The soundtrack album features six tracks, which includes three songs and three instrumentals from the original score. The track "Yavvana" was released, as a single on 29 July 2017, by actor Karthi on social media. The album was launched at Suryan FM Station in Chennai on 4 November 2017. The critical review board at Behindwoods gave the album 2.75 out of 5 stars and wrote, "A fresh album with some instantly attractive and catchy tunes". Mrinalini Sundar of The Times of India said, "Overall, the album impresses".

Release
The film was originally planned to release on 24 November 2017 but was postponed to 8 December 2017. The satellite rights of the film were sold to Sun TV.

Critical reception

Behindwoods rated the film 2.75 out of 5 and stated, "It is undoubtedly a well-woven mystery tale but could have been a little racier". Indiaglitz gave 2.75 out of 5 and stated, "Pradeep Krishnamoorthy of 'Saithaan' fame has extracted solid performances from his cast and technical crew but could have worked harder on the adaptation to better results and concluded with, "Go for it for solid acting from the cast and an unpredictable screenplay replete with twists and turns". Thinkal Menon of The Times Of India gave 3.5 out of 5 and wrote,"Sathya is an engrossing watch which joins the list of interesting thriller films made in Tamil this year". Ashameera Aiyappan of The Indian Express gave 3 out of 5 and said, "The Sibiraj starrer is a gripping tale that doesn’t compromise on the narrative keeping you invested till the end". Sify stated, "It is Sibi Sathyaraj’s best ever performance and he is the glue that holds this film together.  He delivers an intricate, nuanced performance that's hard to fault" and concluded that the film "deserves to be watched, especially for its masterful film-making. It is an intelligent edge-of-the-seat crime thriller". Haricharan Pudipeddi of Hindustan Times gave 3 out of 5 and stated, "Sathya, more or less, succeeds in what Kshanam did with the audience. It does you take you by surprise and the impact can be felt strongly if you’ve not seen the original". Anupama Subramanian of Deccan Chronicle gave 4 out of 5 and said, "Technically, Simon K King’s alluring songs and superb BGM and Arunmani Palani’s brilliant cinematography elevate the film topnotch. A well made gripping thriller, which is not to be missed". A critic from Filmibeat.com gave 3 out of 5 and wrote, "It is always risky to remake a film, especially if it is a thriller. But, Pradeep Krishnamoorthy has done a good job by remaking the Telugu movie Kshanam without losing the essence of the movie. He has been successful in keeping the audiences guessing till the climax with his flawless making".

Box office
The film had an average opening at the Chennai box office.

References

External links
 

2017 films
2010s Tamil-language films
Indian thriller films
Films about child abduction in India
Tamil remakes of Telugu films
2017 thriller films
Films directed by Pradeep Krishnamoorthy